SS Iron Knight may refer to:
 , the first Iron Knight of BHP Shipping
 , later the second Iron Knight of BHP Shipping